The Blonde from Peking (also known as Peking Blonde) is a 1967 French-Italian-German adventure film written and directed by Nicolas Gessner. It is loosely based on the 1966 novel You Have Yourself a Deal by James Hadley Chase.

Cast 

 Mireille Darc as Erika Olsen / Christine
 Claudio Brook as Garland / Gandler
 Giorgia Moll  as Jinny / Nurse Peggy
 Edward G. Robinson as Douglas
 Pascale Roberts as  Monica Davis
   as Captain  Hardy
 Jean-Jacques Delbo as  Olsen
 Valéry Inkijinoff  as  Fang O Kung
   as  Jackson
 Tony Young  as  Yen Hay Sun
 Guido Celano as De Luca
 Joe Warfield  as Doctor
   as Bijoutier
 Françoise Brion as  Erika Olsen #2
 Hellmut Lange  as  Malik
 Werner Schwier  as  Smernoff

References

External links

1967 films
1967 adventure films
1960s crime films
1960s spy comedy films
French adventure films
French crime comedy films
French spy comedy films
Italian crime comedy films
West German films
Films directed by Nicolas Gessner
Films based on works by James Hadley Chase
Films based on British novels
Films about amnesia
Films scored by François de Roubaix
1960s French-language films
1960s French films
1960s Italian films